Corinne Dufka (born 1958) is an American photojournalist, human rights researcher, criminal investigator, and social worker. She is the recipient of a MacArthur "genius grant" Fellowship.

Early life and education 
Dufka grew up in Utah and California received a bachelor's degree from San Francisco State University in 1979. In 1984, she graduated from the University of California, Berkeley with a master's degree in social work.

Work

Social work 
Following completion of her master's degree, Dufka worked as a humanitarian volunteer and social worker in Latin America. She volunteered with Nicaraguan refugees during the country's revolution, and with victims of the 1985 Mexico City earthquake. She then moved to El Salvador as a social worker with the Lutheran church. While in El Salvador, Dufka became close with local photojournalists, and was asked by the director of a local human rights organization to launch a program to document human rights abuses through photography. The director of the program was killed two weeks later, reportedly by death squads. Dufka's photos of his body ran in The New York Times, and she accepted the position.

Photojournalism 
Dufka received her first contract as a photojournalist in 1989, with the Reuters news agency, covering the conflict in El Salvador. In 1992, she relocated to Sarajevo, where she covered the ethnic conflicts in the Balkans. Dufka remained in the region until 1993, when the vehicle in which she was traveling encountered an anti-tank mine. She was seriously injured, suffering facial lacerations, internal injuries, and ligament damage.

Following three weeks of rehabilitation in London, Dufka returned to the field on assignment for Reuters in Mogadishu, Somalia. She remained stationed in East Africa, covering much of the continent for the agency, including the Rwandan genocide. Her images from Rwanda were later used as evidence during the International Criminal Tribunal for Rwanda. She covered famine in Sudan, conflict in the Democratic Republic of Congo, and the Liberian civil war, among others.

In 1998 Dufka went to Nairobi, Kenya to cover the bombing of the American Embassy. She arrived hours after the blast, and was deeply frustrated by 'missing the scoop.' Later, upon watching the news coverage of the attack, Dufka realized that she had lost “compassion” for the subjects of her work, and resolved to end her career as a photojournalist.

Human rights 
In 1999 Dufka left Nairobi to open a field office for Human Rights Watch in Freetown, Sierra Leone, where she documented human rights abuses associated with the country's ongoing civil war. In 2002 she took a leave of absence to work as a criminal investigator for the Chief of Investigations and the Prosecutor for the United Nations' Special Court for Sierra Leone.

In 2003, Dufka returned the United States. That same year she was awarded the MacArthur "genius grant" Fellowship for her journalistic and documentary work documenting the 'devastation' of Sierra Leone and the conflict's toll on human rights. Dufka returned to West Africa in 2005 to lead the Human Rights Watch field office in Dakar, Senegal until 2011. She worked as a senior researcher for the Africa division of Human Rights Watch, overseeing the organization's work on West Africa until 2022.

In 2012, Dufka testified before the United States Senate Foreign Relations Committee on the armed conflict in northern Mali.

Awards
 1996 1st prize, Spot News stories 
 1996 "OPC Awards: The Robert Capa Gold Medal". Overseas Press Club of America.
 1997 International Women's Media Foundation Courage in Journalism Award
1997 Pulitzer Prize Finalist in Spot News Photography 
 2003 MacArthur Fellows Program

Works
Burkina Faso: Armed Islamists Kill, Rape Civilians, Human Rights Watch, May 2022
Mali: Massacre by Army, Foreign Soldiers, Human Rights Watch, April 2022
Burkina Faso: Residents’ Accounts Point to Mass Executions, Human Rights Watch, July 2020
Sahel : « Les atrocités commises par des militaires favorisent le recrutement par les groupes armés », Le Monde Op Ed June 29, 2020
How Much more Blood Must Be Spilled? Human Rights Watch, February 2020
Burkina Faso: Armed Islamist Atrocities Surge, Human Rights Watch, January 2020
Burkina Faso's Atrocities in the Name of Security Will Help Terrorists' Ranks, Washington Post Op-ed, June 12, 2019.
We Found Their Bodies Later That Day” Atrocities by Armed Islamists and Security Forces in Burkina Faso’s Sahel Region, Human Rights Watch, March 22, 2019
“We Used to Be Brothers” Self-Defense Group Abuses in Central Mali, Human Rights Watch  December 7, 2018:  ·        
“By Day We Fear the Army, By Night the Jihadists”Abuses by Armed Islamists and Security Forces in Burkina Faso, Human Rights Watch May 21, 2018
 “Mali: Conflict and Aftermath: Compendium of Human Rights Watch Reporting 2012-2017, February 2, 2017 ·        
Confronting Mali’s New Jihadist Threat, New York Times Op-ed, May 9, 2016.
“We Have Lived in Darkness” A Human Rights Agenda for Guinea’s New Government, Human Rights Watch, May 2011 
"Guinea's depressingly familiar strongman", The Guardian, 30 September 2009
"Charles Taylor's trail of carnage", The New Statesman, 10 April 2006
"Disappearances", Crimes of War
"Youth, poverty and blood: the lethal legacy of West Africa's regional warriors", Volume 17, Issue 5, Human Rights Watch, 2005
"The Mexico City Earthquake Disaster", Social casework, Volume 69, Family Service America, 1988

References

External links
"Nigeria: Use Restraint in Curbing Jos Violence", Human Rights Watch, January 19, 2010
"Open Letter to Corinne Dufka of HRW-Stop Spreading Misleading Information on the Jos Conflict", 21 January 2010

American social workers
American women journalists
1958 births
University of California, Berkeley alumni
MacArthur Fellows
Living people
21st-century American women